KBUY (1360 AM, "K-Buy 105.9") is a radio station broadcasting a classic hits music format. Licensed to Ruidoso, New Mexico, United States, the station is currently owned by Walton Stations-New Mexico, Inc. and features programming from Fox News Radio.

History
The station changed its call sign from KRRR to KREE on 27 June 1983. On 1 May 1987, the station changed its call sign to the current KBUY.

On November 2, 2007, KBUY changed its format from oldies to adult contemporary. On May 26, 2014, it changed its format to classic hits, branded as "K-Buy 105.9".

References

External links

BUY
Classic hits radio stations in the United States